Raymond Allen Krawczyk (born October 9, 1959) is an American former professional baseball player who played five seasons for the Pittsburgh Pirates, California Angels, and Milwaukee Brewers of Major League Baseball (MLB).

Krawczyk was born in Pennsylvania in 1959 but moved with his family to California five years later. He attended Bolsa Grande High School in California and played college baseball at Golden West College and then Oral Roberts.

Krawczyk has worked as a scout for the San Francisco Giants and a youth baseball coach in California.

References

External links

1959 births
Living people
Alexandria Dukes players
American expatriate baseball players in Canada
American people of Polish descent
Baltimore Orioles scouts
Baseball players from Pennsylvania
Buffalo Bisons (minor league) players
California Angels players
Denver Zephyrs players
Edmonton Trappers players
Golden West Rustlers baseball players
Gulf Coast Pirates players
Hawaii Islanders players
Major League Baseball pitchers
Milwaukee Brewers players
Oral Roberts Golden Eagles baseball players
Nashua Pirates players
People from Sewickley, Pennsylvania
Pittsburgh Pirates players
San Francisco Giants scouts
Anchorage Glacier Pilots players